KOEA (97.5 FM) is a radio station broadcasting a Country music format. Licensed to Doniphan, Missouri, United States.  The station is currently owned by Eagle Bluff Enterprises.

References

External links
 

Country radio stations in the United States
OEA